Infinite Disk was an early hierarchical storage management (HSM) and backup utility for DOS, Microsoft Windows, and OS/2 published by Chili Pepper Software of Atlanta in 1992. Infinite Disk introduced HSM, previously limited to mainframes, to personal computers.

The company and the software were acquired by Cheyenne Software in 1995, which was in turn purchased by Computer Associates in 1996.

Infinite Disk, operating in the background, automatically compresses less-active files and eventually migrates them to removable media, but the files remain visible in Windows folders and, when accessed, are fetched from the backup storage.

A variant of Infinite Disk, Personal Archiver, was bundled with Iomega removable drives starting in November 1994.

References

1992 software
Backup software for Windows